The Mexican Academy of Cinematographic Arts and Sciences (AMACC) is a professional honorary organization founded on July 3, 1946, in Mexico City to promote the dissemination, research, preservation, development, and defense of the cinematographic arts and sciences. Currently, the president of the AMACC is producer Mónica Lozano Serrano.

The AMACC is committed to making Mexican cinema known and valued in Mexico and abroad. It organizes meetings between filmmakers, annually rewards the films exhibited during each year, in addition to publishing books that talk about the development of the Mexican film industry, and participates in the conservation of cinematographic works in Mexico. At the same time, it defends the creative and labor freedom of Mexican filmmakers from censorship and labor grievances.

The AMACC is endorsed by the cinematographic trajectory of its members and by their willingness to selflessly defend the present and the future of Mexican cinema.

History
The following people were present before a notary public during the signing of the document:

 Celestino Gorostiza, screenwriter and director
 Felipe Gregorio Castillo, cinematographer
 Raúl de Anda, producer
 Carlos Carriedo Galván, lawyer
 César Santos Galindo, lawyer
 Fernando Soler, actor
 Manuel Fontanals, scenographer
 Ignacio Fernández Esperón “Tata Nacho”, composer
 Eduardo Hernández Moncada, pianist and composer
 Oswaldo Diaz Rúanova, journalist
 Fernando Morales Ortiz, journalist
 Eugenio Maldonado, lawyer

 José María Sánchez García, journalist
 Antonio Castro Leal, lawyer
 Adela Formoso de Obregón Santacilia film instructor
 Carlos Pellicer, screenwriter
 Alejandro Galindo, director and screenwriter
 Juán Manuel Torrea
 Jorge Fernández, scenographer
 Francisco de P. Cabrera, producer
 Ángel Garasa Bergés, actor
 Adolfo Fernández Bustamante, director
 Gabriel Figueroa cinematographer, among others.

This was a moment where the movie industry in Mexico was going through its peak. The year before, alone, 85 movies had been made, a record figure even today. The purpose of creating the Academy was to promote advancements in the arts and sciences of film-making, as well as to give public recognition and to outstanding film productions and promote future research.

In practice, however, most of the efforts of the Academy went on to recognize the best films with its award: the Ariel. Every year, from 1947 to 1958, the Ariel was awarded. After 1958 the number of productions fell considerably and it was not until 1972 when the ceremony was held again, and it has every year until the present year.

Current Administration

Members
Active members
 Mónica Lozano Serrano
 Marina Stavenhagen Vargas
 Flavio González Mello
 Rodrigo Herranz Fanjul
 Ernesto Contreras Flores
 Everardo González
 Lucía Gajá Ferrer
 Nerio Barberis Occhione
 Guadalupe Ferrer Andrade
 Jorge Michel Grau
 Leticia Huijara
 Adela Cortázar
 Alberto Cortés
 Alejandro García
 Arcelia Ramírez
 Armando Casas Pérez
 Axel Muñoz
 Bárbara Enríquez
 Daniel Hidalgo
 Francisco Vargas
 Francisco X. Rivera
 Gloria Carrasco
 Guillermo Granillo
 Ignacio Ortiz
 Inna Payán
 Isabel Muñoz Cota
 Jorge Zárate
 José Sefami
 Juan Carlos Colombo
 Juan José Saravia
 Karina Gidi
 Kenya Márquez Alkadif Cortés
 Laura Imperiale
 Mariana Rodríguez
 Mariestela Fernández
 Miguel Hernández
 Nicolás Echevarría
 Omar Guzmán
 Roberto Fiesco
 Samuel Larson
 Serguei Saldívar Tanaka
 Sofía Carrillo
 Tatiana Huezo
 Verónica Langer
 Víctor Ugalde

Emeritus Members
 Bertha Navarro
 Blanca Guerra
 Carlos Carrera
 Diana Bracho
 Dolores Heredia
 Ernesto Gómez Cruz
 Felipe Cazals
 Jorge Fons
 Jorge Sánchez Sosa
 Juan Antonio de la Riva
 Lucía Álvarez
 Toni Kuhn

Honorary Members
 Centro de Capacitación Cinematográfica, represented by Alfredo Loaeza
 Cineteca Nacional, represented by Alejandro Pelayo
 Dirección General de Actividades Cinematográficas – Filmoteca de la UNAM, represented by Hugo Villa Smythe
 Escuela Nacional de Artes Cinematográficas (UNAM), represented by Manuel López Monroy
 Fernando Pérez Gavilán

References

External links
Official site 
AMACC UNAM
Historia
Premio Ariel - IMCINE 
La AMACC surgió para respaldar la búsqueda de un cine más ambicioso: Juan Antonio de la Riva
Academia Mexicana de Cine, trayectoria de 68 años de trabajo

Film organizations in Mexico
.
1946 establishments in Mexico
Organizations established in 1946